Kojoke is a village in Nookat District of Osh Region of Kyrgyzstan. Its population was 5,342 in 2021.

Population

References

Populated places in Osh Region